Arthur William Edwards (b Dublin 1 July 1818 - d Cork 27 March 1874) was a nineteenth century  Anglican priest.

Edwards was  educated at Kilkenny College and Trinity College, Dublin, graduating BA in 1814 and Master of Arts in 1840. He was ordained in 1842 and began his career with  curacies at Roscrea, Powerscourt and Limerick. He was Archdeacon of Derry from 1855 until 1860; He was Rector of Tamlaght Finlagan from 1860 to 1869; and Dean of Cork from 1869 until his death.

References

1874 deaths
1818 births
Archdeacons of Derry
Alumni of Trinity College Dublin
Christian clergy from Dublin (city)
People educated at Kilkenny College
Deans of Cork